Alla Amidas (c. 540) was a King of the Kingdom of Aksum. He is primarily known from the coins minted during his reign.

Due to die-links between the coins of Alla Amidas and Kaleb, Munro-Hay suggests that the two kings were co-rulers. Alla Amidas possibly ruled the Aksumite territories on the western side of the Red Sea, while Kaleb was campaigning in the east in Southern Arabia.

Some Ethiopian chroniclers claimed that it was during the reign of Alla Amidas that the Nine Saints came to Ethiopia.

Notes 

Kings of Axum
6th-century monarchs in Africa
Year of birth uncertain
Year of death missing